Denis O'Connell may refer to:

Denis J. O'Connell, bishop
Denis O'Connell (Australian politician), Mayor of Gold Coast
Denis O'Connell (Gaelic footballer), see John Joe Sheehy